Mount Johnstone is a mountain,  high, standing at the east side of Liv Glacier, about  southwest of Mount Blood, in the Queen Maud Mountains of Antarctica. It was named by the Advisory Committee on Antarctic Names for C. Raymond Johnstone, a United States Antarctic Research Program logistics officer at McMurdo Station in the winter of 1965.

References

Mountains of the Ross Dependency
Dufek Coast